Ruslan Umarovich Okhtov (born 1 December 1978 in Cherkessk) is a former Russian football player.

References

1978 births
People from Cherkessk
Living people
Russian footballers
FC Zhemchuzhina Sochi players
Russian Premier League players
FC Kuban Krasnodar players
FC Baltika Kaliningrad players
FC Yugra Nizhnevartovsk players
Association football midfielders
Association football forwards
Sportspeople from Karachay-Cherkessia